Rokkamura Dam is an earthfill dam located in Akita Prefecture in Japan. The dam is used for irrigation. The catchment area of the dam is 12.7 km2. The dam impounds about 24  ha of land when full and can store 1790 thousand cubic meters of water. The construction of the dam was completed in 1952.

References

Dams in Akita Prefecture
1952 establishments in Japan